India Tower (previously known as the Park Hyatt Tower; also known as the Dynamix Balwas Tower or DB Tower) is a  canceled 126-story,  megatall skyscraper that began construction in the city of Mumbai, India, in 2010. The tower was originally planned for completion in 2016, but construction work was put on hold in 2011 due to a dispute between the tower's developers and Mumbai's civic authorities.

Planning and construction
The Dynamix Balwas realtor Group first proposed the project, under the name of Park Hyatt Tower, in 2008. The project was subsequently dropped, before being revived and amended in 2010 as a much taller building. In January 2010, the Brihanmumbai Municipal Corporation authorised the tower's construction on a site located at Charni Road in Girgaon, southern Mumbai, just north of Mumbai's historical CBD (Central Business District). Site preparation work commenced in late 2010. However, in May 2011 Mumbai's civic building proposals department issued a stop-work order due to a payment dispute with the developers, halting the tower's construction indefinitely. The tower was cancelled on 16 October 2015.

See also
Legacy Tower
Suzhou Zhongnan Center
Goldin Finance 117
Wuhan Greenland Center
World One
Baoneng Shenyang Global Financial Center
Azerbaijan Tower

References
 India Towers in  South Mumbai

Proposed skyscrapers in India
Skyscraper hotels in Mumbai
Residential skyscrapers in Mumbai